Devils Hole is a geologic formation located in a detached unit of Death Valley National Park and surrounded by the Ash Meadows National Wildlife Refuge, in Nye County, Nevada, in the Southwestern United States.

Devils Hole is habitat for the only naturally occurring population of the endangered Devils Hole pupfish (Cyprinodon diabolis). The  unit is part of the Ash Meadows complex, an area of desert uplands and spring-fed oases that was designated as a National Wildlife Refuge in 1984.

Description
Devils Hole is a geothermal pool within a limestone cavern in the Amargosa Desert in the Amargosa Valley of Nevada, east over the Amargosa Range and Funeral Mountains from Death Valley. The surface area of Devils Hole is about 22 m long by 3.5 m wide (72 ft long by 11.5 ft wide).

According to geologists, the caves were formed over 500,000 years ago. The pool has frequently experienced activity due to far away earthquakes in Japan, Indonesia, Mexico, and Chile, which have been likened to extremely small scale tsunamis.

Below the surface pool, Devils Hole descends approximately  through what is termed the "main chamber" before reaching a narrow opening referred to as the 'funnel'. Through this opening lies a much larger chamber of the cavern system known as Acree's Chasm.

Immediately after passing the funnel into Acree's Chamber, a narrow side tube can be found to a diver's left. This side tube proceeds approximately  upward to a chamber with an air pocket, named Brown's Room. The tube leading to Brown's Room has at least 2 offshoots, the higher of which leads to a dead-end filled with a small air pocket, and the lower of which joins with additional tubes descending from Brown's Room.
Instead, a portion of the chamber floor descends below this lower shelf; a gradual funnel leads to a hole in the bottom of the chamber featuring a strong current.

In 1965, Paul Giancontieri, a teenager who jumped the fence with friends to go SCUBA diving the hole did not come back up. Another, David Rose, went down to find him but did not come back up either. Efforts by five divers to later find their bodies were unsuccessful.

Due to the strong current, small size of the entrance, and unknown depth of the below cavern Houtz termed the "Infinity Room," Jim and his partner chose not to explore this Infinity Room. This mission did, however, confirm that the depth of the Infinity Room of Devil's Hole, and the cavern system itself, has a depth of at least  from the surface.

This provided further evidence that Devils Hole cave system was connected to not only the Death Valley Regional Groundwater Flow System, but possibly to even further-reaching underground water systems. The 1991 USGS dive team described the Devils Hole as a "skylight" into the water table.

A team of paleoclimatologists from the University of Innsbruck have been collecting and dating calcite mineral deposits here since 2010.  In March 2017, underwater cinematographer Jonathan Bird received permission to assist scientists in a four-day expedition to take water and calcite core samples. The IMAX footage was included in the 2020 film Ancient Caves and extra footage was used to create the video documentary .

Similar studies had been done in Devils Hole but are no longer permitted due to the endangered status of the Devils Hole pupfish. Cleaning and disinfection of diving equipment, climbing gear, cameras, etc. using hot water and Steramine followed by at least 30 days of air-drying is required by the National Park Service to prevent contamination of the underwater ecosystem.

Seiches were also observed in the cave after powerful earthquakes in 2012, 2018 and 2019.

Devils Hole Cave 

It had been described as being shaped like a boot with fallen rock restriction at the  level leading to a narrow pool of  water. Since no sunlight reaches the water, algae cannot grow and no fish species are found.

On the surface, the cave openings are connected to Devils Hole by an access road and covered with a locked metal grate.  Below ground, a passable deepwater connection to Devils Hole has been theorized but remains undiscovered.

Pupfish

Devils Hole is the only natural habitat of the Devils Hole pupfish, which thrives despite the hot, oxygen-poor water.  Devils Hole "may be the smallest habitat in the world containing the entire population of a vertebrate species". The pupfish are considered critically endangered by the IUCN. The pupfish has been described as the world's rarest fish, with a population of 263 as of 2022. Genetic information indicates that the pupfish species is as old as the Hole itself, which opened to the surface about 60,000 years ago.

The pupfish have been protected since being declared an endangered species in 1967. Conflicts of the ownership and use of the groundwater around Devils Hole caused litigation in the 1980s. The litigation triggered further protections of the pupfish. However, since the late 1990s, the pupfish population has substantially decreased. The reasons for the decrease are unknown, but is possibly due to a microscopic non-indigenous diving beetle that is consuming pupfish eggs.

See also
 Cyprinodon - Genus

References

External links

The Southwestern Naturalist: "Pupfish Populations"
Death Valley Natural History Association - Video of Seismic Waves in the Pool

Caves of Nevada
Springs of Nevada
Amargosa Desert
Desert National Wildlife Refuge Complex
Death Valley National Park
Bodies of water of Nye County, Nevada
Limestone caves
Wild caves